Harrington Beach State Park is a  Wisconsin state park on the shore of Lake Michigan in the Town of Belgium. In addition to a mile-long beach, the park contains a white cedar swamp surrounding a  lake that used to be a stone quarry. The park provides campgrounds, hiking trails, picnic, and bird watch areas.

History
From the 1890s until 1925, a dolomite quarry operated at the on the site of the park. From 1901 until 1925, the Lake Shore Stone Company developed a company town called Stonehaven at the site. Most of the workers were immigrants from Luxembourg, the Austro-Hungarian Empire, and Italy. When the quarry closed, some of the residential buildings were moved to the Village of Belgium. The foundations of some of the building remain in the state park.

In 1968, the Wisconsin Department of Natural Resources began buying the properties that would become Harrington Beach State Park. A campground of 73 sites opened in 2009; it was the first new campground at a Wisconsin State Park in over 20 years. Construction began in 2008 and it was completed in the beginning of September 2009. It opened with 32 electric sites, 33 non-electric sites, 5 walk-in sites, one kayak site (only accessible by water), one group campsite, and one site for the campground host. Before the campground was added, the park had up to 120,000 visitors per year.

References

External links
Harrington Beach State Park official site
Wisconsin Department of Natural Resources

Landforms of Ozaukee County, Wisconsin
Protected areas established in 1992
Protected areas of Ozaukee County, Wisconsin
Quarries in Wisconsin
State parks of Wisconsin
1992 establishments in Wisconsin